David Graham Bowker (15 March 1922 – 18 March 2020) was a British sailor. He won a silver medal in the 5.5 metre class at the 1956 Summer Olympics. Born the third of five children in Salford, he was a bomber pilot in the Second World War before going on to start a yacht-building business in Bosham with his older brother Robin.

References

1922 births
2020 deaths
British male sailors (sport)
Sailors at the 1956 Summer Olympics – 5.5 Metre
Olympic sailors of Great Britain
Olympic silver medallists for Great Britain
Olympic medalists in sailing
Medalists at the 1956 Summer Olympics
Royal Air Force pilots of World War II
British World War II bomber pilots
People from Salford
People from Bosham